KVTO (1400 AM) is a radio station broadcasting a Chinese format. Licensed to Berkeley, California, United States, the station serves the San Francisco Bay Area. The station is currently owned by Phuong Pham, through licensee Pham Radio Communication LLC. Its tower is located in Berkeley, California, and is shared with KEAR.

It is an affiliate of Cantonese-language Sing Tao Chinese Radio, and leases additional programming from other groups.

History

The station began in Berkeley in 1922 as KRE, the former callsign of a marine radio station aboard a World War I merchant marine steamship, Florence H., destroyed in an April 17, 1918, explosion at Quiberon Bay, France. The Maxwell Electric Company put KRE on the air on March 11, 1922, with studios and transmitter at the Claremont Resort Hotel. In May of that year, KRE was sold to the Berkeley Daily Gazette; the station was sold again in January 1927, this time to the First Congregational Church of Berkeley, which moved the studios and built a new transmitter. In January 1930, the Chapel of the Chimes (an Oakland funeral home) bought KRE; ownership passed in December 1936 to Central California Broadcasters, a wholly owned subsidiary of the Chapel of the Chimes. New studios and transmitter were built at 601 Ashby Avenue from 1937 to 1938.  

KRE-FM went on the air on February 14, 1949, with a transmitter on Round Hill Mountain, which was moved to the Ashby Avenue near Berkeley's Aquatic Park site in 1950. In March 1963, KRE was taken over by the Wright Broadcasting Company of Paterson, New Jersey.Later programming was simulcast on KRE-FM and there were occasional AM/FM stereo broadcasts, including some classical music programming.  KRE's call letters changed to KPAT in 1963, then back to KRE in 1972. The call letters KBLX were adopted in 1986, then changed to KBFN in 1989 and back to KBLX in 1990. The current call letters, KVTO, were adopted in 1994; the 1400 AM frequency was a simulcast of KBLX-FM 102.9, which was a sister station of KVTO until May 1, 2012 when Entercom Communications officially took over KBLX.

In the summer of 1972, George Lucas filmed radio legend Wolfman Jack at the KRE studios for the film, American Graffiti. (Some artistic license was employed for the movie: the Wolfman is shown doing his program live from California, although the Brinkley Act made such broadcasting illegal.)

References

External links
FCC History Cards for KVTO

Sing Tao Chinese Radio (Chinese)
Bay Area Metro Radio (Chinese)
Bay Area Chinese Radio (Chinese)
Global Chinese Radio (Chinese)
The Peter Buhrmann Show

VTO
Radio stations established in 1922
Mass media in Berkeley, California
1922 establishments in California
Radio stations licensed before 1923 and still broadcasting